Nokia 105 (2015) is a Nokia-branded mobile phone developed by Microsoft Mobile. It was released on 3 June 2015.

References

External links 
 Nokia 105 (2015)

105 (2015)
Microsoft hardware
Mobile phones with user-replaceable battery
Mobile phones introduced in 2015